Orchestral percussion refers to the various percussion instruments used in an orchestral setting. It may also refer to the act of playing such instruments in an orchestral style. Many music schools and conservatories offer training for musicians interested in developing their skills as orchestral percussionists. Typically, an orchestral percussionist does not specialize in one particular instrument. Although there is no exhaustive list of all instruments that an orchestral percussionist must be able to play, there are particular instruments that are frequently used in the orchestral repertoire. This includes timpani, snare drum, bass drum, xylophone, glockenspiel, triangle, and tambourine.

Mallet instruments
Mallet percussion (also known as a keyboard or tuned percussion) is the general name given to the pitched percussion family. The name is a slight misnomer, in that almost every percussion instrument is played with some type of mallet or stick. With the exception of the marimba, almost every other keyboard instrument has been used widely in an orchestral setting.

There are many extremely common and well-known excerpts for most of the mallet instruments.  Gershwin's Porgy and Bess remains the most requested xylophone excerpt at auditions, with Copland's Appalachian Spring, Kodály's Háry János Suite, and Kabalevsky's Colas Breugnon being other common choices, although the list is practically endless.

The glockenspiel has become a staple of the orchestra as well, and, as such, has had many important and difficult parts written for it. Dukas's The Sorcerer's Apprentice as well as Respighi's Pini di Roma are both extremely common excerpts on audition lists.

Another keyboard instrument used in the orchestra, as well as jazz, is the vibraphone.  The most commonly requested excerpt for vibraphone at orchestral auditions is from Leonard Bernstein's "West Side Story."  The "Little Blue Devil" movement from "Seven Studies on Themes of Paul Klee" by Gunther Schuller is also frequently requested.

Drums

Bass drum 
In an orchestral setting, the concert bass drum plays an integral role in the overall feel of a piece of music. In orchestral literature, the bass drum usually deals more with coloring and shading the sounds of the orchestra as opposed to providing a solid, rhythmic foundation like in marching band drumset.  The bass drum is usually used to accent strong points in the music and is often combined with a cymbal crash to further accentuate the moment.  In fact, the two instruments are used in conjunction so often that many parts simply contain one rhythm and the composer then indicates which instruments are to play at which points.

Though the bass drum is possibly the least frequently requested instrument at auditions, it actually takes a fair amount of skill to play correctly. Given the number of variables that can change when playing the bass drum (beater, beating location, amount/type of muffling, stroke, etc.), a well-versed percussionist is usually required to obtain all the possible sounds from the instrument.

Some important excerpts for the bass drum in orchestral literature include Stravinsky's The Rite of Spring, Tchaikovsky's Symphony No. 4, Romeo and Juliet, and 1812 Overture, many of the Mahler symphonies (most notably his third), and Symphonie Fantastique by Hector Berlioz.

Snare drum 
The snare drum is one of the most easily recognizable instruments in the entire percussion section. Also called the side drum, the snare drum is often used as a means of accenting rhythms from other families of instruments within the orchestra or as a soloistic type, particularly in pieces that may have a "military" type theme or sound to them.

The snare drum works extremely well as an accentuating instrument.  Tuned and played correctly, it can produce sounds ranging from quick, short, and snappy to thick, warm, whip-crack-like accents.  There are numerous examples in music of the snare drum being used in this fashion.  One such example would be the fourth movement of Nikolai Rimsky-Korsakov's symphonic suite Scheherazade.  In this particular example, the snare drum is used to accentuate the various crescendos and "hits" played by the rest of the orchestra.  It is also used to reinforce the rhythms played by the trumpets throughout the movement.

As a soloistic instrument, the snare drum has certainly found its place in classical music.  A fantastic example of this use of the snare drum would be the opening of Sergei Prokofiev's Lieutenant Kijé suite.  After an opening trumpet solo, the snare drum plays a rather short, military-style solo at a pianissimo dynamic marking, designed to create a march-like feel.  This particular part presents a number of problems for the orchestral percussionist, but its main difficulty lies in keeping the various rudiments (flams, four-stroke ruffs, etc.) consistent at such a soft dynamic level.

Another difficult Snare Drum piece in classical music is:

Bolero (somewhat demanding due to the exposed nature, the same two measures repeated for about 15 minutes, driving the entire orchestra to the end).

Traditional rudimental solos that show a snare drummers technique include:

The Connecticut Halftime, The Three Camps, and 'The Downfall of ParisThere has been a marked deviation from high-sticking, traditional drumming to a forced low-stick style.  Various techniques of the snare drum include the Moller method, the Gladstone method, and other lesser methods.

 Concert toms 
Much like the bass drum, the concert toms are meant to add color and shading to orchestral music. However, it can also be used much like the snare drum. In fact, the snare drum can have the snare off, producing a high tom sound. Depending on the composer and/or music, the concert tom can be used as both. It gives a warm but sharper tone due to its size, being between 8 and 16 inches in diameter, whereas the concert bass is 30 to 45 inches. Factors such as the feel of the piece and the time period in which it was written are taken into account when using the concert tom.

Auxiliary percussion
Auxiliary percussion (also known as battery percussion or accessory percussion) include instruments like the triangle, castanets, and tambourine.  These instruments are often overlooked and treated as trivial or unimportant simply because, to the untrained eye (or ear), they seem easy to play.  The truth is, however, that auxiliary percussion often requires the most use of extended techniques and that the parts for these instruments are frequently the most difficult. Other auxiliary percussion instruments include:

Anvil
 Bongos
 China cymbal
 Claves
 Congas
 Cowbell
 Crash cymbal
 Djembe
 Finger cymbals
 Güiro
 Hi-hat
 Maracas
Mark tree
Rainstick
Ratchet
 Ride cymbal
Rototom
 Shaker
 Suspended cymbal
 Temple blocks
Vibraslap
 Wind chimes
 Wood block

Cymbals and gongs
 Crash cymbals (also known as clash cymbals)
Crash cymbals have been used in an orchestral setting since the time of Mozart when he adopted their sound from traditional Turkish bands to be used in his opera Abduction from the Seraglio.  Since then, crash cymbals have become one of the most written for percussion instruments in classical music and they are easily one of the most recognized sounds within the orchestra.
 Gong/tam tam
 Suspended cymbal

Gongs and tam-tams are easily confused with one another. A gong, generally, is a large hung cymbal with a nipple. As such, they are usually known as nipple gongs. This nipple is a small dome in the centre of the cymbal that produces a single note when struck with a soft beater. Conversely, a tam-tam has no nipple and a flat central area. When this cymbal is struck with a beater (most usually a soft beater), it produces a myriad of sounds with no single overruling note.

One can distinguish the two by ear by following a simple method. A gong sounds like a slightly muffled church bell, producing a soft but clear note, whereas the tam-tam sounds much more like a large metal object being struck by a hard material.

 Examination 
Associated Board of the Royal Schools of Music, Trinity College London and London College of Music provide examination for orchestral percussion player. Candidates perform a balanced programme of three pieces, one chosen from mallet percussion song list, one from snare drum song list and one from timpani song list.

Further reading
Blatter, William, Instrumentation/Orchestration'', Schirmer Books